Alpers is an unincorporated community in Carter County, Oklahoma, United States. The elevation is 965 feet. A post office operated in Alpers from July 15, 1918, to November 14, 1931.

References

Unincorporated communities in Carter County, Oklahoma
Unincorporated communities in Oklahoma